Isba was a city on the border of ancient Pamphylia. It has been identified with the modern village of Çeşme.

Isba became a Christian bishopric, a suffragan of the metropolitan see of Side, the capital of the Roman province of Pamphylia Prima, to which Isba belonged. No longer a residential bishopric, Isba is today listed by the Catholic Church as a titular see.

References

Catholic titular sees in Asia
Former populated places in Turkey
Ancient Greek archaeological sites in Turkey
Roman towns and cities in Turkey
Populated places in ancient Pamphylia
Populated places of the Byzantine Empire